John Pritchard may refer to:

John Pritchard (basketball) (1927–2012), American professional basketball player
John Pritchard (bishop) (born 1948), Anglican Bishop of Oxford
John Pritchard (Canadian politician) (1861–1941), Progressive party member of the Canadian House of Commons
John Pritchard (conductor) (1918–1989), British conductor
John Pritchard (footballer) (born 1995), English footballer
John Pritchard (MP) (1797–1891), British Member of Parliament for Bridgnorth
John Pritchard (rower) (born 1957), British rower who competed in the 1980 and 1984 Summer Olympics
John Pritchard (singer)
J. E. M. Pritchard (John Edward Maddock Pritchard, 1889–1921), British airship captain
John Langford Pritchard (1799–1850), English actor
John Laurence Pritchard (1885–1968), British mathematician and writer
John T. Pritchard (1883–1965), Wisconsin State Assemblyman
Jack Pritchard (1899–1992), British furniture designer

See also
John Prichard (1817–1886), Welsh architect